Babelomurex neocaledonicus is a species of sea snail, a marine gastropod mollusc in the family Muricidae, the murex snails or rock snails.

Description

Distribution
New Caledonia, deep water

References

 Kosuge, S. & Oliverio, M., 2001. A new coralliophiline species from the southwest Pacific (Neogastropda: Muricidae: Coralliophilinae). Journal of Conchology 37(3): 285–290

External links
 MNHN, Paris: holotype

neocaledonicus
Gastropods described in 2001